Gustavo Gutiérrez (born 7 April 1933) is a Venezuelan épée, foil and sabre fencer. He competed in five events at the 1952 Summer Olympics.

References

External links
 

1933 births
Living people
Venezuelan male épée fencers
Olympic fencers of Venezuela
Fencers at the 1952 Summer Olympics
Pan American Games medalists in fencing
Pan American Games bronze medalists for Venezuela
Fencers at the 1955 Pan American Games
Venezuelan male foil fencers
Venezuelan male sabre fencers
20th-century Venezuelan people
21st-century Venezuelan people